Formate dehydrogenase (acceptor) (FDHH, FDH-H, FDH-O, formate dehydrogenase H, formate dehydrogenase O) is an enzyme with systematic name formate:acceptor oxidoreductase. This enzyme catalyses the following chemical reaction

 formate + acceptor  CO2 + reduced acceptor

Formate dehydrogenase H is a cytoplasmic enzyme that oxidizes formate without oxygen transfer] transferring electrons to a hydrogenase.

References

External links 
 

EC 1.1.99